Anabel Medina Garrigues was the defending champion and successfully defender her title, by defeating Klára Koukalová 6–4, 6–0 in the final.

Seeds

Draw

Finals

Top half

Bottom half

References
 ITF tournament profile

Internazionali Femminili di Palermo - Singles
2005 Singles